Slava is a tiny crater on the Moon. It is near the site where Soviet lunar rover Lunokhod 1 landed in November 1970, in the Mare Imbrium region. Its diameter is 0.1 km. The name Slava does not refer to a specific person; it is a Slavic male name, a diminutive form of Yaroslav and other names.

References

External links

Slava at The Moon Wiki
 Old Moon Rover Beams Surprising Laser Flashes to Earth
 
 

Impact craters on the Moon
Mare Imbrium